Urk Lighthouse is a lighthouse in Urk at the eastern banks of the IJsselmeer. From 1617 a coal fire was used for the local fishermen as well as for the ships sailing from Amsterdam to the North Sea. The current lighthouse station was established in 1837. The tower was built in 1845 as a round brick tower attached to a keeper's house. A Fresnel lens is still in use. The lighthouse was restored in 1972 and declared a national monument of the Netherlands in 1982. The tower can be visited during guided tours.

See also

 List of lighthouses in the Netherlands

References

 Urk Lighthouse Marinas.com
 

Lighthouses completed in 1845
Lighthouses in the Netherlands
Rijksmonuments in Flevoland
Tourist attractions in Flevoland
Towers in Flevoland
Urk